The HgcE RNA (also known as Pf3 RNA) gene is a non-coding RNA that was identified computationally and experimentally verified in AT-rich hyperthermophiles. The genes in the screen were named hgcA through hgcG ("high GC").  The HgcE has been renamed as Pf3 and identified as an H/ACA snoRNA that is suggested to target 23S rRNA for pseudouridylation. This RNA contains two K-turn motifs. It was later identified as Pab105 H/ACA snoRNA with rRNA targets.

See also
 HgcC family RNA
 HgcF RNA
 HgcG RNA
 SscA RNA

References

External links
 

Non-coding RNA